Harri Arhio, professionally known as PistePiste, is a Finnish pop artist. His debut album Hetken maailma on tässä was released in August 2013.

Selected discography

Albums

Singles

References

Living people
Finnish musicians
Year of birth missing (living people)